Dipterocarpus gracilis (Tagalog: panao) is a critically endangered species of tree in the family Dipterocarpaceae, native to South Asia and Southeast Asia.

The species is found in Kalimantan, Bangladesh, India (the Andaman and Nicobar Islands, Arunachal Pradesh, Assam and Tripura), Indonesia (Java, Kalimantan, Sumatra), Peninsular Malaysia, Myanmar, Thailand, the Philippines and Vietnam.

This large tree is found in lowland seasonal semi-evergreen and evergreen dipterocarp forests.

Uses
It is often used as a commercial grade plywood, it is one of the most important sources of keruing timber.

References

gracilis
Indomalayan realm flora
Flora of tropical Asia
Critically endangered flora of Asia